Malevolent is a 2018 British horror film directed by Olaf de Fleur Johannesson from a screenplay by Ben Ketai and Eva Konstantopoulos, based on the novel Hush by Konstantopoulos. The film centers on a team of scam artists who are making money from faked paranormal encounters. During an assignment at a country house, the team get more than they bargained for and one by one, they begin to lose grip on reality.

The film stars Florence Pugh, Ben Lloyd-Hughes, Scott Chambers, Georgina Bevan, James Cosmo, and Celia Imrie. It was released on 5 October 2018 by Netflix.

Plot
In 1986 Scotland, Angela and Jackson are American siblings who, with a small team of paranormal investigators, run a fake medium scam on clients who believe their houses are haunted. The team uses the reputation of the siblings' late mother to promote Angela's powers as a medium. Jackson orchestrates the scams because of a debt he owes to loan sharks.

During their latest assignment, strange incidents occur, causing Angela to worry about the parallels to her mother, who heard voices and wound up committing suicide because she saw people who weren't there. A new client, Mrs. Greene, requests they come to stop the girls' "screaming." Angela is too disturbed and shaken from their last assignment so she turns down the request; she looks into the history of the caller's house and discovers that the owner’s foster children were all found dead with their mouths sewn shut 15 years prior, and her son was blamed. Jackson, needing the money to pay off the loan sharks, agrees to the job, despite reluctance from his sister.

Jackson and his team of technicians formulate a plan to con Mrs. Greene. While Elliot (the cameraman) films Angela around the mansion, she sees spirits of the murdered girls and follows them into the restricted East Wing where the floor collapses under Elliot's feet. He falls and injures his foot, and in his rescue Jackson and Angela discover the place where the girls had been kept.

Mrs. Greene informs Jackson that they have failed and she believes them to be scam artists. It becomes apparent that Jackson has been seeing things himself (previously using drugs and headphones to block it out), and finally decides to abandon the job after Mrs. Greene implies that she was involved in the girls' murders. Jackson finds Beth, his technician/girlfriend, unconscious with her mouth sewn shut in the attic. Attempting to flee with the others, Jackson crashes the car into a tree, killing Beth.

Herman appears at the crash site and knocks Jackson and Elliot unconscious with a shovel. Herman then takes Jackson up to the house where Mrs. Greene cuts out his tongue, breaks his jaw with a hammer and chisel, and sews his mouth shut. She then orders Herman to take him out to the shed and kill him.

Elliot manages to kill Herman just as Mrs. Greene gets started sewing Angela's mouth up. Enraged by her son's murder, Mrs. Greene attacks Elliot with a saw, hitting him repeatedly. The spirits of the dead girls appear and Angela pleads and begs with them to help. They begin to scream, distracting Mrs. Greene from hurting Elliot long enough for Angela to free herself and kill her. Limping away from the house, Angela sees Jackson's ghost searching for Beth before wandering away down the road. Angela breaks down crying, attracting the attention of a passing car.

Angela and Elliot are taken to the hospital. Over the phone with her grandfather Angela tells him what has happened and her grandfather sobs, telling her that she can't be alone now. But Angela replies: "I'm not alone" as a dark shadow passes over her.

Cast

Release
The film was released on 5 October 2018 by Netflix.

Reception

Brian Tallerico of RogerEbert.com wrote "It's not going to be anyone's favorite new horror film this holiday season, but it's a solid enough start to the month when temperatures drop and it becomes cooler to tell ghost stories".

References

External links

2018 horror films
2010s supernatural horror films
British haunted house films
British supernatural horror films
Films directed by Olaf de Fleur
Films set in 1986
Films set in country houses
Films set in Scotland
Films shot in Scotland
English-language Netflix original films
2010s English-language films
2010s British films